The Girl Who Forgot is a 1940 British comedy film directed by Adrian Brunel and starring Elizabeth Allan, Ralph Michael and Enid Stamp-Taylor.

It was made at the Nettlefold Studios in Walton-on-Thames, based on a play The Young Lady in Pink by Gertrude E. Jennings. The film's sets were designed by the art director Holmes Paul. It was the final film of Brunel, who had been a leading director during the silent era.

Synopsis
On the train back from her school to Paddington, an eighteen-year-old girl named Leonora loses her memory. This coincides with her father's decision, having just got his pilot's license to take her mother on a flight to Baghdad. Lost in a hotel in London, she is rescued by a young man who wants to help her. However his fiancée is extremely jealous, and arranges for a poor confidence trickster to pretend to be her mother in exchange for cash.

Cast
 Elizabeth Allan as Leonora Barradine
 Ralph Michael as Tony Stevenage
 Enid Stamp-Taylor as Caroline Tonbridge
 Basil Radford as Mr. Barradine
 Jeanne de Casalis as Mrs. Barradine
 Muriel Aked as Mrs. Badger
 David Keir as Drawbridge
 Rita Grant as Ada Badger
 Eileen Sharp as Sara

Bibliography
 Wood, Linda. British Films 1927-1939. British Film Institute, 1986.

External links

1940 films
1940 comedy films
British comedy films
1940s English-language films
Films directed by Adrian Brunel
Films shot at Nettlefold Studios
Films set in London
British black-and-white films
British films based on plays
1940s British films